Bacillus fumarioli is a species of aerobic endospore-forming bacteria. It is moderately thermophilic and acidophilic, with type strain LMG 17489T.

This species has been recently transferred into the genus Neobacillus. The correct nomenclature is Neobacillus fumarioli.

References

Further reading

Berkeley, Roger, et al., eds. Applications and systematics of bacillus and relatives. John Wiley & Sons, 2008.
Dion, P., and C. Shekhar Nautiyal. Microbiology of extreme soils: forew. by John D. Rummel. Berlin [etc.]: Springer, 2008.

External links

LPSN
Type strain of Bacillus fumarioli at BacDive -  the Bacterial Diversity Metadatabase

fumarioli
Bacteria described in 2000